is Rimi Natsukawa's fifth original album, released on . According to Natsukawa, title was chosen for the album as it gave an image of "so many thoughts put into song. Of course, it's not a strong wind, but a fresh wind I want to reach the listeners."

Background

"Umui Kaji" was released after two singles. "Sayōnara Arigatō (Ama no Kaze)/Mirai" in August 2006 was a re-arrangement of her song "Sayōnara Arigatō" (a single from Ayakaji no Ne) by the song's writer, Kentarō Kobuchi of Kobukuro. The second A-side, "Mirai," did not feature on the album. "Furusato" was written by singer Noriyuki Makihara, and was used as the theme song for the drama Asakusa Fukumaru Ryokan.

Collaborations

Many of the tracks feature collaborations with popular musicians or high-profile composers/lyricists. "Matsuri no Ato Kaze" is a collaboration with Okinawan singer Isamu Shimoji and Begin guitarist Hitoshi Uechi. "Eisa no Yoru" was performed by Okinawan band Parsha Club was the backing band, and was composed by member Masaaki Uechi.

The bonus track is a collaboration with Andrea Bocelli that featured on the Japanese release of his album Amore (also as a bonus track there).

Track listing

Japan sales rankings

References

Rimi Natsukawa albums
2007 albums
Victor Entertainment albums